The 1940–41 Segunda División season saw 24 teams participate in the second flight Spanish league. Granada, Real Sociedad, Deportivo and Castellón were promoted to Primera División. Real Avilés, Badalona and Córdoba were relegated to Tercera División.

Group 1

Teams

League table

Results

Group 2

Teams

League table

Results

Promotion playoffs

First round

League table

Results

Second round

Relegation playoffs

External links
LFP website

Segunda División seasons
2
Spain